Suzan Hall is a Toronto politician, best known for her role as city councillor in Toronto for Ward 1 Etobicoke North.  A longtime resident of Etobicoke, she originally entered politics as a school board trustee.  She eventually became chair of the Etobicoke Board of Education.  With the creation of the new city of Toronto, she moved to become vice-chair of the Toronto District School Board.  In the 2000 Toronto municipal election, she defeated longtime incumbent Bruce Sinclair in a close race, finishing only 97 votes ahead of fellow challenger Vincent Crisanti.  The 2003 election was again a close race between her and Crisanti. She lost the 2010 election to Crisanti.

Election results

Unofficial results as of October 26, 2010 03:55 am

References

External links
Suzan Hall profile on City of Toronto website

Toronto city councillors
Women municipal councillors in Canada
Women in Ontario politics
Living people
Year of birth missing (living people)